They Look Like People is a 2015 independent psychological horror film shot, edited, written, produced and directed by Perry Blackshear. It was his feature film directorial debut. It premiered on January 25, 2015 at the Slamdance Film Festival, where it won a special jury award. It stars MacLeod Andrews as a man who believes humanity is being secretly taken over by evil creatures.

Plot
Close friends Wyatt and Christian, who have drifted apart, reunite in New York City, where Christian invites Wyatt to stay at his apartment. Wyatt has withdrawn into himself, having recently broken up with his fiancée, while Christian, who's also broken up with his fiancée, attempts to counter his insecurities with bodybuilding and aggressive machismo. As the two old friends bond, Christian invites Wyatt along on the date he has with his supervisor, Mara, calling ahead and asking Mara to invite her friend.

Wyatt and Christian arrive to find that Mara's friend Sandy has fallen and injured herself. Wyatt examines Sandy and recommends she go to the hospital. Wyatt, Christian, and Mara spend the evening in the waiting room until Sandy's release, and Mara gratefully thanks Christian for staying. As Mara walks Christian to the subway, he fails to take the initiative to kiss her goodnight. Wyatt reassures Christian that Mara is probably still interested in him despite the end of the evening. After Christian falls asleep, Wyatt receives an anonymous phone call, where a muddled voice tells him he only has time to save himself, and he must leave the city and prepare for demonic invasion.

Wyatt confers with a psychiatrist about his fears of psychosis, but cuts the session short when he becomes convinced the psychiatrist himself is possessed by demons.

Mara and Christian continue seeing each other. Wyatt receives subsequent phone calls, this time in Mara's voice, alerting him to ominous signs of the apocalypse and the demons' nature, specifically how they infect humans. Wyatt stockpiles weapons in Christian's cellar and alternately contemplates both suicide and the murder of passersby he believes possessed.

With his newfound assertiveness, Christian believes himself to be in line for a raise, only for Mara to reveal that he has been fired. A note on his computer, signed by his coworkers, accuses him of being an asshole. Christian returns home to find Wyatt waiting for him. Before he can say anything, Mara visits. At first angry, Christian apologizes and invites her in. The three chat amicably, and Christian leaves to get a specific tea Mara wanted. Wyatt invites Mara to explore the house and takes her downstairs to show her his weapon stash. Wyatt asks her for further information on the demonic invasion, alluding to her voice on the phone. When Mara realizes Wyatt's seriousness, she flees. Christian returns, disappointed that she left. Wyatt becomes highly agitated and rants about the coming demonic invasion. Christian calms him down and sets him up with a psychiatrist, the same one Christian went to when he attempted suicide.

Wyatt accosts Mara, trying to apologize, and she lashes out in self-defense, injuring him. Seeming remorseful, she helps him clean up, but he is horrified when she transforms into a demon. Wyatt runs away and finds Christian preparing to join the army to conquer his insecurities. Wyatt convinces him to leave the city and prepare for the coming apocalypse. Christian agrees, as long as Wyatt attends his psychiatric appointment. As Wyatt sees omens of the apocalypse, he instead insists they barricade the basement. To show his trust in Wyatt, Christian allows himself to be bound and gagged in case he is possessed. On the hour of the apocalypse, Wyatt becomes convinced Christian is possessed and prepares to kill him as he watches Christian transform. At the last moment, Wyatt realizes he is hallucinating, and recognizing Christian as truly human, frees him. Christian remarks that he has finally conquered his insecurities by facing death, and the two embrace.

Cast
 MacLeod Andrews as Wyatt
 Evan Dumouchel as Christian
 Margaret Ying Drake as Mara
 Mick Casale as Psychiatrist
 Elena Greenlee as Sandy

Reception

The film holds an approval rating of 92% on Rotten Tomatoes based on 12 reviews, with an average rating of 7.52/10.

Horror websites Fangoria and Dread Central both wrote positive reviews for the film; Dread Central's Ari Drew wrote that it was "a deliberately paced and subdued stunner of a film that succeeds above all in its genuine approach of concern and respect for its realistically horrifying subject matter." Film School Rejects praised the film for its treatment of mental illness, commenting, "It's rare to find a genre film that takes the time to explore the human behind the madness while still providing thrills". Screen Anarchy and SciFiNow also gave the film positive reviews, and both felt the actors and the director were highlights.

References

External links
 
 

Films about mental health
2015 films
2015 horror films
2015 directorial debut films
2010s English-language films